Staythorpe is a hamlet and civil parish in the Newark and Sherwood district of Nottinghamshire, England.

Toponymy 
Staythorpe was listed in the Domesday Book in 1086, it was then called Startorp, meaning 'Stari 's village,'.

Geography 
The settlement is situated 3 miles west of Newark-on-Trent, and lies alongside the banks of the River Trent.
The village is primarily rural in nature with much farmland, but very little in way of amenities.

Staythorpe's neighbours include
 Averham to the north;
 Upton to the west;
 Rolleston to the south;
 Farndon to the east.

Rundell and Pingley Dykes are 2 streams which run through the parish.

The land is very low-lying and level, varying little in elevation between  throughout.

Communities 
There are three distinct residential areas in Staythorpe parish:
 The historic village area by Pingley Lane
 Behay Gardens
 The Hughs Close gated community alongside the Nottingham to Lincoln railway level crossing.

Governance and demographics 
The population of Staythorpe reported alongside Averham parish is 294 residents.
Averham, nearby Kelham and Staythorpe, although each are parished, they are grouped together to form a parish council for administrative efficiency because of their small populations.

Economy 
Other than farming, electricity generation and distribution are the only large scale local industries:
 Staythorpe Power Station is located by the riverside and owned by RWE
 There is a large substation operated by the National Grid.

History 
Staythope in medieval times belonged to the monastery of Newstead, but when King Henry VIII renounced the Catholic Church and dissolved the monasteries, he gave the land to Trinity College, Cambridge. In 1946 a large area of land was sold to the Derbyshire & Nottinghamshire Electric Power Company, the building of Staythorpe Power Station was begun and the first turbine unit was put into service in March 1950. Thirteen workers cottages now known as Behay Gardens were built for power station staff by this time, greatly increasing the size of the village.  The cottages were designed by local architect Thomas Cecil Howitt.  Thomas Cecil Howitt, OBE, was a British provincial architect of the 20th Century. Howitt is chiefly remembered for designing prominent public buildings, such as the Council House and Processional Way in Nottingham. A larger power station, Staythorpe B was built alongside the first, construction commenced in 1956 and was officially opened in May 1962. The first or 'A' station was decommissioned in 1983 and demolition was started in 1986 and finished in 1988. Staythorpe B closed in 1994. Staythorpe C opened in 2010. The power station employee housing has since been sold off to the general public.

Landmarks 
The long distance Trent Valley Way walking path passes through the parish and follows the River Trent.

There is one listed building, the Manor House based in the core village area and is designated at Grade II. It dates from the end of the 18th century.

Transport 
The Nottingham to Lincoln railway line passes through the parish west to east. However, the nearest stop is 1 mile south west at Rolleston railway station.

References 

Villages in Nottinghamshire
Civil parishes in Nottinghamshire
Newark and Sherwood